The women's halfpipe competition of the Vancouver 2010 Olympics was held at Cypress Mountain on February 18, 2010.

Results

Qualification

Semifinal

Final

References

 http://www.vancouver2010.com/olympic-snowboard/schedule-and-results/ladies-halfpipe-qualification_sbw060900t4-eo.html

External links
 2010 Winter Olympics results: Ladies' Halfpipe, from http://www.vancouver2010.com/; retrieved 2010-02-17.

Snowboarding at the 2010 Winter Olympics
Women's events at the 2010 Winter Olympics